Glen Hnatiuk (born May 15, 1965) is a Canadian professional golfer.

Early life
Hnatiuk was born in Selkirk, Manitoba, Canada and attended the University of Southern Mississippi for college in the United States. He turned professional in 1990 and would then play on the Nationwide Tour for many years.

Professional career
Hnatiuk played his first full season on the Nationwide Tour in 1992, picking up one win in his rookie season and over $50,000 in earnings. He would play at Q-School later that year, but finished T85 and did not earn is PGA Tour card.

In 1993, in 28 events on the Nationwide Tour, Hnatiuk made only four cuts and $4,000. Hnatiuk played full seasons on the Nationwide Tour through 1997, picking up his second and third career wins in playoffs in 1995 and 1996 and earning about $200,000. In 1998, he secured his PGA Tour card and earned $148,000 which was not enough to retain he PGA status and he once again returned to the Nationwide Tour for the 1999 season.

The 1999 Nationwide Tour season was again a good one for Hnatiuk, picking up his 4th career win and $176,000 in earnings. He played on the PGA Tour in 2000, finishing with two top-10s and 5 top-25s. He finished with $482,000 in earnings.

The 2001 PGA Tour season included five top-25s and over $400,000 in earnings and conditional status for Hnatiuk for 2002. In 2002, he made over $500,000 with eight top-25s, one of which was at the St. Jude Classic, where he held a four stroke lead going into th final round, but shot a final round 77 to finish T14.

Hnatiuk would play a full season in 2003, nine events in 2004, and a full season in 2005, making over $650,000 in those three seasons combined, but going back to the Nationwide Tour for 2006.

His latest season on the Nationwide Tour was in 2006, making 11 of 20 cuts and only a little over $50,000 in earnings.

Hnatiuk played three Nationwide Tour events in 2007, making one cut. He has not played an event on the Nationwide Tour or PGA Tour since August 2007.

Hnatiuk plays in the Canadian Tour Players Cup, which is considered major on the Canadian Tour.

He has over $2,000,000 in career earnings on the PGA Tour and over $580,000 in career earnings on the Nationwide Tour.

Personal life
Hnatiuk now is a school teacher at the school [Explorer K-8].

Professional wins (4)

Nike Tour wins (4)

*Note: The 1996 Nike Carolina Classic was shortened to 54 holes due to rain.

Nike Tour playoff record (2–1)

Team appearances
World Cup (representing Canada): 2000

See also
1997 Nike Tour graduates
1999 Nike Tour graduates
List of golfers with most Web.com Tour wins

References

External links

Canadian male golfers
PGA Tour golfers
Korn Ferry Tour graduates
Golfing people from Manitoba
Southern Miss Golden Eagles and Lady Eagles athletes
Sportspeople from Selkirk, Manitoba
1965 births
Living people